Dr. Jekyll & Mr. Hyde is a Canadian film directed by Paolo Barzman and starring Dougray Scott. Set in Montréal, Québec, Canada, it was released theatrically in both the US and UK in 2008 and on DVD in 2009.

Synopsis
In modern day Boston, prominent medical researcher Dr. Henry Jekyll spends his evenings experimenting with a rare flower from the Amazon jungles. The natives say the flower has the power to separate the human soul into good and evil parts. After Jekyll's evil side, known as Mr. Hyde, commits a series of murders, Jekyll's DNA is found on one of the victims and he is arrested.  Confined to an asylum, Jekyll realizes Hyde must be brought under control. He retains the services of attorney Claire Wheaton and tells her his story. Wheaton is skeptical until Jekyll gives her a locket worn by one of the murdered girls. Wheaton agrees to represent Jekyll and decides to argue in court that Jekyll and Hyde are two separate people and therefore should not be held responsible for each other's actions.

Cast 
Dougray Scott as Dr. Henry Jekyll and Edward Hyde
Tom Skerritt as Gabe Utterson
Danette Mackay as Ms. Poole
Krista Bridges as Claire Wheaton
Jack Blumenau as Ned Chandler
Ellen David as Detective Newcom
Cas Anvar as D.A. McBride
Vlasta Vrana as Judge Sheehan
Ian Finlay as Chief of Staff
Kathleen Fee as Mrs Lanyon
Carlo Mestroni as Terrance Gartrell
Ifan Meredith as Dr Arthur Lanyon
Patrick John Costello as Walter Swain
Susan Almgren as Mental Health Expert
Arthur Holden as Fowler
Gordon Masten as Bob Lanyon

Reception
The film was not well received. Exclaim! called it "completely unnecessary and frequently laughable".PopMatters titled its review "A Stale Telling of an Old Tale." Variety criticized the screenplay, saying it "botched the fundamental underpinnings and purged any nuance from the story." DVD Talk compared it unfavorably with other versions of the story. The New York Times, The News Journal, and The Akron Beacon-Journal also offered their reviews.

References

External links 
 
 Dr Jekyll and Mr Hyde at YouTube
 Review at Moria Reviews
 Review at Eye for Film
 Review at Dread Central
 Review at Festivale
 Reviews

2008 films
Dr. Jekyll and Mr. Hyde films
Films directed by Paolo Barzman
2000s English-language films